Celaenorrhinus consanguinea is a species of butterfly in the family Hesperiidae. It is found in China and Taiwan.

Subspecies
Celaenorrhinus consanguinea consanguinea (Yunnan)
Celaenorrhinus consanguinea chihhsiaoi Hsu, 1990 (Taiwan)

References

Butterflies described in 1891
consanguinea
Butterflies of Asia